Jukumarini (Aymara jukumari bear, -ni a suffix to indicate ownership, "the one with a bear", also spelled Jucumarini) is a  mountain in the Andes of Bolivia. It is situated in the La Paz Department, Larecaja Province, Sorata Municipality. Jukumarini lies north of the main range of the Cordillera Real, southwest of the mountain Ch'uch'u and west of Ch'uch'u Apachita.

See also 
 Chunta Qullu

References 

Mountains of La Paz Department (Bolivia)